Rafael Edgardo Burgos (born June 3, 1988 in La Paz, El Salvador) is a Salvadoran professional footballer who plays as a forward for Independiente.

Club career
Burgos started his career at Alianza F.C., but moved to Segunda División club Santa Tecla F.C. to get some more playing time. In 2010, he returned to the highest level to play with UES. In 2011, he rejoined his old club Alianza F.C..

In 2012, he transferred to Deportivo Petapa scoring his first goal in a victory against Municipal on February 12, 2012. He scored another goal on March 3, 2012 against C.D. Suchitepéquez, and his last goal for the end of his 2011–12 season on May 4, 2012 against Juventud Retalteca. Even though he started late in Petapa's season he maed to score five goals in nine games.

On August 8, 2012, Burgos signed a loan deal with Baník Ostrava on loan from Austrian Bundesliga club SV Ried. On the 31st, he moved on loan to Kecskemét of Hungary after Baník did not reach an economic agreement with the player.

After spending a season with Kecskemét, he went on a second loan to Hungarian champions Győri ETO, where he appeared in nine league games, scoring one goal

In February 2015, he cancelled his contract with SV Ried, becoming a free agent

On March 17, 2015, Rafael "Tatarata" Burgos signed with Fredrikstad Fotballklubb (also known as Fredrikstad FK or FFK) which is a Norwegian football club from the town of Fredrikstad.

International career
Burgos received his first appearance with the El Salvador national football team in a game versus Panama, with the game ending in a loss of 1–0.

In his second cap with the El Salvador national football team, Burgos scored his first goal, on Costa Rican soil. A feat that did not happen since 1991 when Raúl Díaz Arce, in the first edition the UNCAF tournament, scored on Costa Rican soil.

Burgos was called up by José Luis Rugamas to train with the senior team in preparation for the 2011 Central American Cup in January 2010. Burgos scored the first goal for El Salvador for the year on January 14, 2011 in a 2–0 victory against Nicaragua.

On January 16, 2011, he scored two goals against Belize helping his team out with a 5–2 victory. On February 11, 2011, he scored another goal in a 2–3 loss in a friendly against Jamaica.

Burgos scored his first goals in the World Cup Qualifications on November 15, 2011 against Suriname. His two goals in that game and the two goals of Osael Romero scored lead to a 4–0 victory.

Burgos scored two goals against the "Oceania leader" New Zealand in a 2–2 draw.

International goals

Honours

Club
Champion
Primera División (1): Clausura 2011

Minnesota United
Champion
North American Supporters' Trophy (1): 2014

Individual
 Copa Centroamericana Golden Boot (1): 2011

References

External links
 Rafael Burgos at Soccerway

1988 births
Living people
People from La Paz Department (El Salvador)
Salvadoran footballers
Association football forwards
El Salvador international footballers
2011 Copa Centroamericana players
2013 Copa Centroamericana players
2013 CONCACAF Gold Cup players
2014 Copa Centroamericana players
2015 CONCACAF Gold Cup players
Alianza F.C. footballers
Santa Tecla F.C. footballers
SV Ried players
FC Baník Ostrava players
Kecskeméti TE players
Győri ETO FC players
Fredrikstad FK players
C.D. FAS footballers
C.D. Sonsonate footballers
Deportivo Petapa players
Universidad de San Carlos players
Minnesota United FC (2010–2016) players
C.D. Luis Ángel Firpo footballers
Liga Nacional de Fútbol de Guatemala players
Nemzeti Bajnokság I players
Norwegian First Division players
North American Soccer League players
Salvadoran expatriate footballers
Expatriate footballers in Austria
Expatriate footballers in Hungary
Expatriate footballers in Norway
Expatriate footballers in Guatemala
Salvadoran expatriate sportspeople in Austria
Salvadoran expatriate sportspeople in Hungary
Salvadoran expatriate sportspeople in Norway
Salvadoran expatriate sportspeople in Guatemala